Ruthenberg is a German language habitational surname. Notable people with the name include:
 C. E. Ruthenberg (1882–1927), American Marxist politician
 Georg Ruthenberg (1959), American musician
 Sebastian Ruthenberg (1984), German professional poker player
 Trevor Ruthenberg (1968), American Marxist politician

References 

German-language surnames
German toponymic surnames